LeRoy Van Duyne (December 3, 1923 – November 26, 2003) was an American politician who served in the Illinois House of Representatives from 1975 to 1991.

References

1923 births
2003 deaths
People from Will County, Illinois
Democratic Party members of the Illinois House of Representatives
20th-century American politicians